Magic Valley is the debut studio album by American hard rock band, Goodbye June. The album was released on May 5, 2017, through Interscope.

Track listing

Charts 
Oh No (single)

References

External links 
 

2017 debut albums
Goodbye June albums
Interscope Records albums